The discography of Jake Zyrus, a Filipino singer, consists of five studio albums, three extended plays (EP), fifteen singles, and eight music videos. Jake recorded under the name Charice before coming out in 2017 as a transgender man. He was the first Asian solo artist to reach the top 10 of Billboard 200 chart. Forbes listed him among the most influential singers in Asia. Guinness World Records recognized him as the world's "youngest winning judge."

In 2008, Zyrus released his debut EP under Star Records entitled Charice, which was certified platinum. In 2009, he released his first full studio album, the Philippines-exclusive My Inspiration, which was also certified platinum.

On the May 18 episode "Finale: Oprah's Search for the World's Most Talented Kids" of The Oprah Winfrey Show, he debuted his first internationally released single "Note to God", written by Diane Warren and produced by David Foster. The single was made available for digital download on the same day and debuted at number 44 on the Billboard Hot 100, and number 35 on the Canadian Hot 100 chart. He released the single for his international debut album, "Pyramid", which featured rapper, Iyaz. It became his most successful single to date, charting within the top 40 in a number of countries, and also debuted on The Oprah Winfrey Show, where he sang live.

He released his first international studio album, Charice in 2010. The album entered the Billboard 200 at number eight. In late 2010, he released an extended play titled Grown-Up Christmas List.

In 2011, Jake began working on his second international album, Infinity, collaborating with various artists. "Before It Explodes" was released as the lead single from the album, written by Peter Gene Hernandez (Bruno Mars) and Ari Levine of The Smeezingtons, who produced it. According to Billboard magazine, "Louder" was the album's second single, released in May 2011.

Albums

Extended plays

Singles

As lead artist

As featured artist

Other charted songs

Other appearances

Music videos

Notes

References

Discographies of Filipino artists